False Paradise  is a 1948 American Western film starring William Boyd as western character Hopalong Cassidy. This fi;m was the sixty-fifth of sixty-six Hopalong Cassidy movies and was the 11th of 12 Hopalong Cassidy Westerns produced by William Boyd for United Artists release.

Plot

Cast
 William Boyd as Hopalong Cassidy
 Andy Clyde as California Carlson
 Rand Brooks as Lucky Jenkins
 Elaine Riley as Anne Larson
 Cliff Clark as Banker Waite
 Joel Friedkin as Professor Alonzo Larson
 Kenneth MacDonald as Bentley (as Kenneth R. MacDonald)
 Don Haggerty as Deal Marden
 George Eldredge as Radley
 Richard Alexander as Sam - Henchman
 Zon Murray as Buck - Henchman

References

External links
 
 
 
 

1948 films
1948 Western (genre) films
Paramount Pictures films
American Western (genre) films
Hopalong Cassidy films
American black-and-white films
Films directed by George Archainbaud
1940s English-language films
1940s American films